Carr Square is a neighborhood of St. Louis, Missouri.  The Downtown neighborhood is bounded by Cass Avenue on the North, Carr Street on the South, North Tucker Boulevard and North 13th Street on the East, and North Jefferson on the West.

Demographics
In 2020 Carr Square's racial makeup was 94.9% Black, 2.1% White, 2.0% Two or More Races, and 0.7% Some Other Race. 0.9% of the population was of Hispanic or Latino origin.

New Carr Square streetcar line

In June 2013 Forbes magazine profiled new streetcar systems of ten American cities that had built or were building new modern streetcar systems.
According to Forbes, St. Louis is considering building a new modern line to connect downtown to Carr Square.

References 

Neighborhoods in St. Louis